Sunland Park may refer to:

 Sunland Park, New Mexico
 Sunland Park Racetrack & Casino, in Sunland Park, New Mexico
 Sunland Park Mall, in El Paso, Texas
 Sunland Park, in Sunland, California